Rahul Jariwala is an American cricketer who plays as a wicket-keeper for the United States cricket team.

Jariwala was born in Fremont, California and was 15 years old when he first played for the United States under-19 cricket team. In 2019, Jariwala played for the under-19 team in the qualification matches for the 2020 Under-19 Cricket World Cup.

Following his performances in the Minor League Cricket, and being named the USA Junior Cricketer of the Year, Jariwala earned his maiden call-up to the national team. In May 2022, he was named in the USA's One Day International (ODI) squads for round 12 and round 13 of the 2019–2023 ICC Cricket World Cup League 2 tournament. He made his ODI debut on 4 June 2022, against the United Arab Emirates.

References

External links
 

2003 births
Living people
American cricketers
Cricketers from California
United States One Day International cricketers
Sportspeople from Alameda County, California
American sportspeople of Indian descent